Pyburn Bluff is a cliff on the Tennessee River in Hardin County, Tennessee.

has the name of Jacob Pyburn, proprietor of a ferry at this spot.

References

Geography of Hardin County, Tennessee
Cliffs of the United States